This is a list of airlines of Yukon which have an air operator's certificate issued by Transport Canada, the country's civil aviation authority. These are airlines that are based in Yukon.

Current airlines

References

Yukon
Airlines